Reunion is a 1932 British drama film directed by Ivar Campbell and starring Stewart Rome, Anthony Holles and Fred Schwartz. It was a quota quickie made at Shepperton Studios for release by the American studio MGM.

Premise
An ex-army officer helps out an old comrade.

Cast
 Stewart Rome as Major Tancred  
 Anthony Holles as Padre  
 Fred Schwartz as Pawnbroker 
 Robert Dudley as Sgt. Dudley 
 Eric Pavitt as Boy  
 George Bishop as Jews-Harpist 
 Kit Keen as Bones 
 Harry Blue     
 Noel Dainton 
 Bernard Dudley  
 Roddy Hughes   
 Terry Irvine  
 John Lalette  
 Randolph McLeod
 Leonard Morris
 Robert Newton  
 James Prior   
 Philip Ritti    
 James Stadden
 Gerald Steyn
 Harry Terry   
 Colin Wark   
 Freddie Watts    
 Bob Wilkins

References

Bibliography
Wood, Linda. British Films, 1927–1939. British Film Institute, 1986.

External links

1932 films
1932 drama films
British drama films
Films set in England
Films shot at Shepperton Studios
Films directed by Ivar Campbell
British black-and-white films
1930s English-language films
1930s British films